The Bomarsund Bridge connects Bomarsund with the Prästö island in the Sund municipality of Åland.

Bridges in Åland